This article is a list of PSA women's number 1 ranked players in the Official Women's Squash World Ranking.

The Official Women's Squash World Ranking are the Professional Squash Association's (PSA) merit-based method for determining the world rankings in women's squash. The top-ranked player is the player who, over the previous 12 months, has garnered the most PSA ranking points. Points are awarded based on how far a player advances in tournaments and the category of those tournaments. The WISPA, the WSA and the PSA has used a computerized system for determining the rankings since April 1984.

An updated rankings list is released at the beginning of each month.

Number 1 ranked Women's squash players
The statistics are updated only when the PSA website revises its rankings (usually every first of each month).

Accumulated totals are bolded on each player's final streak.
As of March, 2022.

Months at number 1

As of March, 2022

Note: Active streak is in bold.

Months at no. 1 by country

As of March, 2022

Players who were ranked World no. 1 without having won a World Championship

As of July, 2021.

See also
 Official Women's Squash World Ranking
 PSA World Tour
 List of PSA number 1 ranked players
 Official Men's Squash World Ranking

References

External links

Squashsite: Nicol overtakes Michelle

Women's squash
Squash records and statistics
Lists of squash players
Lists of sportswomen